Saber Porto (formerly Bigmoon Entertainment) is a Portuguese video game developer based in Porto, Portugal, with additional offices in Sheffield, United Kingdom.

The company was founded in 2008 by Paulo J. Gomes ( Paulo J. Games) to create video games for PC and consoles, along with animated films and television series like TIC TAC TALES and PIKABOO.

Over the years, Bigmoon transitioned to work exclusively on video games, participating in game projects related to different genres. The company was recognized for being involved in racing games, such as the WRC series, MotoGP13, FlatOut4: Total Insanity, and Dakar 18.

On 18 October 2019, it was announced that Bigmoon Entertainment was acquired by Saber Interactive and renamed Saber Porto.

History

2008–2014 
The company started in 2008 as Bigmoon Animation Studios, and developed TV animation series for kids. Its first production was TIC TAC TALES, a TV animation series with 39 episodes, created by Paulo J. Gomes and broadcast by RTP, RTP África, RTP Internacional, and distributed in Europe by Panini Media in 2010, 2011, and 2012. In 2009, Bigmoon Animation Studios produced TV animation musicals for Canal Panda and distributed them on DVD by Info capital with the title PIKABOO.

After the release of TIC TAC TALES, a second company was formed: Bigmoon Interactive Studios, which was developing the game version of TIC TAC TALES called D-TEAM: The Kidnapping of Professor Zig.

In 2012, Bigmoon Interactive Studios started working for Milestone (WRC 3 and WRC – THE GAME) and bitComposer, working in the game North & South. After the success of both partnerships, Milestone contracted Bigmoon to create motorcycles for MotoGP 13, bitComposer asked it to work on Jagged Alliance: Back in Action, and OG Games contacted the company to develop My Health Club for mobile devices. In January 2013, when Bigmoon was finishing Jagged Alliance: Back in Action for Linux and Macintosh, a contract was signed with Head Up games to develop a new PC action RPG game: Trapped Dead: Lockdown.

In December 2014, Bigmoon Interactive Studios received the information that its main publisher partner, bitComposer, entered insolvency,  canceling ongoing projects. In the same year, Maximum Games contracted Bigmoon to develop the PS4 and Xbox One port from the PC game Lichdom: Battlemage using CryEngine 3. In June 2015, while Bigmoon was developing the console version for Lichdom, Maximum Games hired the company to complete and port Alekhine's Gun to PS4 and Xbox One.

2016–present 
In 2016, Bigmoon Entertainment released Alekhine's Gun and Lichdom: Battlemage, and started a new contract with Astragon Entertainment to develop Police Simulator 18, later renamed Police Simulator: Patrol Duty.

Bigmoon then started working with Camel 101 on the survival-horror game Syndrome and individually in the classic RPG Demons Age.

Bigmoon released its first self-publishing title Syndrome in September 2017.

By the end of 2016, Gomes wanted to bring a new game genre to the industry, and he created the Rally Raid racing subgenre, securing exclusive rights to develop and publish his own version of the Dakar Rally. In 2017, he entered into an agreement with Koch Media to proceed with Dakar 18. The game involved all the resources of the studio and was the biggest Portuguese investment in videogame development, being released for PS4, Xbox One and PC in September 2018.

In 2019, Bigmoon worked with Saber Interactive to port Call of Cthulhu for the Nintendo Switch. After the success of Call of Cthulhu's development, Saber Interactive and Bigmoon Entertainment entered into an acquisition agreement that was finalised in October 2019.

Saber Interactive acquired Bigmoon Entertainment and rebranded it to Saber Interactive Porto (Saber Porto).

Bigmoon animated films and series

Bigmoon games and collaborations

Cancelled games

References

Saber Interactive
Video game development companies
Video game companies established in 2008
Video game companies of Portugal
Portuguese companies established in 2008
Companies based in Porto
2019 mergers and acquisitions